Lloyd Samartino Jr. (born February 2, 1960) is a Filipino actor.

Personal life
Samartino's mother is Carmen Soriano, an actress and singer. Samartino's wife was Jo Ramos, a singer and daughter of former Philippines President Fidel V. Ramos. They have a son, Sergio.

Career
Samartino started his career as a commercial model for Close-Up tooth paste in 1978. His first film appearance was Gabun: Anak Mo, Anak Ko in 1979. He became popular matinee-idol in 1980s. Samartino portrayed as a leading man of actresses including Nora Aunor, Vilma Santos-Recto and Rio Locsin.

Filmography

Television

Film
Gabun: Anak Mo, Anak Ko (Agrix Films, 1979)
Annie Batungbakal (1979)
4 na Maria (Agrix Films, 1980)
Problem Child (1980)
Good Morning Sunshine (Lea Productions, 1980)
Salamat... Kapatid Ko! (1980)
Unang Yakap – Roy (1980)
Reyna ng Pitong Gatang – Joey Sta. Maria (1980)
Bongga Ka 'Day! (1980)
Sampaguitang Walang Halimuyak (1980)
Totoy Boogie – Totoy Boogie (1980)
Pag-Ibig Ko, Hatiin Ninyo (1980)
Nakakabaliw, Nakakaaliw (1981)
Showbiz Scandal (1981)
Ibalik ang Swerti (1981)
Bawal (1981)
Tropang Bulilit (1981)
Rock n' Roll (1981)
Ito Ba Ang Ating Mga Anak (1982)
Anak – Gabriel (1982)
No Other Love (1982)
Diosa – Teddy (1982)
Indecent Exposure (1983)
Strangers in Paradise – Tony (1983)
Mortal Sin (1983)
Andrea, Paano Ba ang Maging Isang Ina? – Emil (1990)
Iisa Pa Lamang – Eric (1992) 
Santo-Santito (1996) 
Anak ng Bulkan – Greg Miranda (1997) 
Naglalayag – Dorinda's dead husband (Angora Films, 2004) 
Happily Ever After (2005) 
I Will Always Love You – Edward Ledesma (Regal Films & GMA Films, 2006) 
I've Fallen For You – Randy Reyes (Star Cinema, 2007) 
Tutok – Mr. Delgado (2009) 
Kamoteng Kahoy – Congressman (2009) 
Nandito Ako... Nagmamahal Sa'yo – Orly Suganob (Regal Films, 2009) 
Paano na Kaya – Alvin (Star Cinema, 2010) 
Rosario – Don Enrique's Friend (Cinemabuhay International & Studio 5, 2010) 
My Valentine Girls (segment "Soulmates") – Aia's father (GMA Films & Regal Films, 2011) 
The Road – Ella's father (GMA Films, 2011) 
Shake Rattle & Roll 13 (segment "Parola") – Norman (Regal Entertainment, 2011) 
Amorosa: The Revenge – Lito (2012) 
Biktima (2012) 
Bayang Magiliw (2013) 
Lihis (2013) 
Sa Ngalan ng Ama, Ina, at mga Anak – Derick Pagano (Star Cinema, 2014) 
Felix Manalo – Juan Natividad (Viva Films, 2015) 
Whistleblower (2016) 
This Time – Aldrin's father (Viva Films, 2016)
Isa Pang Bahaghari – Cenen (Heaven's Best Entertainment and Solar Pictures, 2020)
Love Is Color Blind – Ninong Gary (Star Cinema, 2021)

References

External links

1960 births
Living people
Filipino male film actors
Filipino male television actors
ABS-CBN personalities
GMA Network personalities